10140 Villon, provisional designation , is a Nysian asteroid from the inner regions of the asteroid belt, approximately  in diameter. It was discovered on 19 September 1993, by Belgian astronomer Eric Elst at the CERGA Observatory at Caussols in France. It was named after 15th-century French poet François Villon.

Orbit and classification 

Villon is member of the Nysa family, one of the largest asteroid families. It orbits the Sun in the inner main-belt at a distance of 2.1–2.7 AU once every 3 years and 9 months (1,375 days; semi-major axis of 2.42 AU). Its orbit has an eccentricity of 0.13 and an inclination of 3° with respect to the ecliptic.

Physical characteristics 

Villon spectral type has not been determined, Based on its family classification and measured albedo (see below), it is likely a stony S-type asteroid. It has an absolute magnitude of 13.7. As of 2018, no rotational lightcurve of Villon has been obtained from photometric observations. The body's rotation period, pole and shape remain unknown.

Diameter and albedo 

According to the survey carried out by the NEOWISE mission of NASA's Wide-field Infrared Survey Explorer, Villon measures 4.785 kilometers in diameter and its surface has an albedo of 0.280.

Naming 

This minor planet was named after medieval French poet François Villon (1431–1463). The official naming citation was published by the Minor Planet Center on 28 July 1999.

References

External links 
 Asteroid Lightcurve Database (LCDB), query form (info )
 Dictionary of Minor Planet Names, Google books
 Discovery Circumstances: Numbered Minor Planets (10001)-(15000) – Minor Planet Center
 
 

010140
Discoveries by Eric Walter Elst
Named minor planets
François Villon
19930919